ABC News at Noon is an Australian midday news programme which airs on ABC TV and ABC News and is presented by Ros Childs (weekdays) and Miriam Corowa (weekends) from the ABC's main national news studios at Ultimo.

A separate edition of the bulletin is produced for Western Australia two to three hours after the original broadcast, as the time delay was deemed too long to remain up-to-date.

History
The bulletin was launched in February 2005 to replace the less successful Midday News and Business, preceded in turn by the long-running World at Noon.

In March 2014, the programme's running-time was extended to one hour. 
 
Brigid Glanville, Nicole Chettle, Deborah Rice and Tracy Kirkland are the main fill in news presenters for the bulletin.

Australian television news shows
Australian Broadcasting Corporation original programming
2005 Australian television series debuts
2010s Australian television series
English-language television shows
Television shows set in Sydney